is a Japanese English-language announcer for NHK and a presenter on Japan Sumo Association's English-language YouTube channel.

Born in Tokyo, Hiroshi moved to Colombus, Ohio when he was a teenager due to his father's job transfer. He graduated Ohio State University and was later hired by NHK as a producer, but later became an English-language announcer. His beginnings in the broadcast industry was unusual as he directly asked NHK producer Shigeno Tateno to give him a chance with no previous experience.

NHK newsline
Hiro Morita joined NHK in 1994 and was for a time an announcer on NHK World-Japan, in the international news program (called NHK Newsline).

Sumo

Sumo commentary and highlights
Hiro Morita is also known for his programs related to professional sumo on NHK World. He is a play-by-play announcer since 1999 and covers sumo tournaments on the program he hosts, GRAND SUMO, since 2016 where he makes preview, review and highlights on sumo news. Since 2022, he's also the host of DOSUKOI Sumo Salon, a program that presents parts of sumo history and statistics related to the sport.

Sumo Prime Time
In August 2022, the Japan Sumo Association launched an English-language YouTube channel called Sumo Prime Time in hopes of drawing a larger international audience to sumo. Launched at the initiative of Hiro Morita, this new channel provides basic sumo explanations such as rikishi routine or training and kimarite moves. It also provides exclusive interviews of elders and rikishi, generally the winner of the previous tournament and popular figures of the sport. The general tone of the channel is light-hearted. Sumo Prime Time is essentially a two-person operation, with writing and presenting duties being handled by Hiro while the shooting and editing are managed by Yusuke Kobayashi, an experienced director who was also part of the team that created NHK World's "Grand Sumo Preview".

References

External links
 Sumo Prime Time YouTube channel

Japanese television presenters
Living people
1968 births
People from Tokyo
Japanese announcers
Japanese television personalities
Japanese YouTubers
Ohio State University College of Education and Human Ecology alumni